Boquerón Bay (Spanish: Bahía de Boquerón) is a bay of the Mona Passage located on the coast of Cabo Rojo, Puerto Rico. El Poblado de Boquerón, or just Boquerón for short, located in the barrio of the same name, is the main settlement located along the bay. The bay is a major tourist destination as it hosts the Boquerón Beach (Balneario de Boquerón) and Los Pozos Beach. The Boquerón Lagoon (part of the Cabo Rojo National Wildlife Refuge) and the Boquerón Iris Alameda Wildlife Refuge (part of the Boquerón State Forest) are located immediately to the east of the bay next to Boquerón Beach.

See also 
 Tourism in Puerto Rico

References 

Bays of Puerto Rico
Bodies of water of Puerto Rico
Cabo Rojo, Puerto Rico